Grevillea fililoba is a species of flowering plant in the family Proteaceae and is endemic to a restricted area in the south-west of Western Australia. It is a spreading shrub with soft foliage, divided leaves with narrow linear lobes, and clusters of pink to bright red and white flowers.

Description
The upper surface of the leaves is more or less glabrous, the edges rolled under obscuring most of the lower surface.

Taxonomy
This grevillea was first formally described in 1986 by Donald McGillivray who gave it the name Grevillea thelemanniana subsp. fililoba in his New Names in Grevillea (Proteaceae) from specimens collected by Robert Royce in 1986. In 1994, Peter M. Olde and Neil R. Marriott raised the subspecies to species level as Grevillea fililoba in The Grevillea Book. The specific epithet (fililoba) means "thread-lobed".

Distribution and habitat
This grevillea grows in a range of habitats and is found east of Geraldton in the catchments of the Greenough and Irwin Rivers in the Geraldton Sandplains biogeographic region of south-western Western Australia.

Conservation status
Grevillea fililoba is listed as "Priority One" by the Government of Western Australia Department of Biodiversity, Conservation and Attractions, meaning that it is known from only one or a few locations which are potentially at risk.

Use in horticulture
This grevillea is well-known in cultivation, often by the cultivar names Grevillea 'Ellendale' or 'Ellendale Pool'. It is readily grown from seed or cuttings and grows best in well-drained soil in full sun, but is often short-lived in humid areas of eastern Australia.

References

fililoba
Eudicots of Western Australia
Proteales of Australia
Plants described in 1986
Taxa named by Donald McGillivray